Carmen Bradford (born July 19, 1960, Austin, Texas) is an American jazz singer. She sang with the Count Basie Orchestra from 1983 to 1991.

Bradford grew up in a musical family; her grandfather is Melvin Moore, her father Bobby Bradford, and her mother Melba Joyce. She studied music formally at Huston-Tillotson College, and sang as a popular singer and for television commercials before scoring a slot opening for the Count Basie Orchestra in 1982. In 1983 Basie asked her to sing with the band, and she remained a singer with the group after Basie's death, under the direction of Thad Jones and Frank Foster. In 1991 she left the group and worked under her own name, releasing several albums; she has also worked with David Murray and Kamau Daaood. 

Bradford is currently Director of the Jazz Voice Department, and a Roots, Jazz, and American Music faculty member at the San Francisco Conservatory of Music.

Discography
 Finally Yours (Amazing, 1992)
 With Respect (Evidence, 1995)
 Home with You (Azica, 2004)

As guest
 Benny Carter, Benny Carter Songbook (MusicMasters, 1996)
 Count Basie, All About That Basie (Concord Jazz, 2018)

References

American jazz singers
American women jazz singers
1960 births
Living people
Jazz musicians from Texas
Count Basie Orchestra members